Tusk is a 2014 American independent body horror comedy film written and directed by Kevin Smith, based on a story from his SModcast podcast. The film stars Michael Parks, Johnny Depp, Justin Long, Haley Joel Osment, and Genesis Rodriguez. The film is the first in Smith's planned True North trilogy, followed by Yoga Hosers (2016).

The film deals with an arrogant podcaster (Long) who travels to Canada for an interview, and in the process meets an eccentric retired sailor (Parks) with dark plans related to his obsession with a walrus named Mr. Tusk.

Tusk had its world premiere at the Toronto International Film Festival, before it was released on September 19, 2014, by A24 and it received mixed reviews, with praise given to its atmosphere and production values but criticism for its inconsistent tone. The film was Smith's first major wide release since Cop Out (2010). However, some sources note that the divide amongst viewers and critics lends to a sort of cult status among some circles online.

Plot
Best friends Wallace Bryton and Teddy Craft host a podcast called The Not-See Party in which they interview eccentric people. Wallace flies to Canada to interview the Kill Bill Kid, who has become an internet sensation due to a viral video of him accidentally severing his leg with a katana. Wallace's girlfriend, Ally, stays behind. Upon arriving in Manitoba, he learns that the Kill Bill Kid has committed suicide. Determined to not waste his trip, Wallace tries to find another person to interview. He finds a flyer from someone offering a room in his home for free and the guarantee of hearing interesting stories. Intrigued, he arrives at the mansion of Howard Howe, a retired seaman in a wheelchair.

Howard tells the story of how a walrus, whom he named "Mr. Tusk", rescued him after a shipwreck. Wallace passes out from the secobarbital laced in the tea Howard made for him. The next morning, Wallace wakes up to find himself strapped into a wheelchair and his left leg amputated. Howard reveals that he can still walk and lays out his plans to fit Wallace into a perfectly constructed walrus costume in an attempt to re-create Mr. Tusk. Ally and Teddy, who are having an affair, each ignore their phones when Wallace calls them for help. After leaving voicemails for them, Wallace is knocked unconscious by Howard.

Now aware that Wallace is in danger, Ally and Teddy fly to Canada. Back at the mansion, Howard continues to mutilate and alter Wallace while relaying his backstory: a Duplessis orphan following his parents' murder, he was physically and sexually abused for five years by the clergy who fostered him, leaving him with severe misanthropy. He attaches Wallace to a walrus costume made of human skin, complete with tusks made from Wallace’s severed tibia bones. A local detective puts Ally and Teddy in touch with Guy LaPointe, a former Sûreté du Québec inspector who has been hunting Howard for years. LaPointe explains that Howard, nicknamed "the First Wife", has been kidnapping and murdering people for years; he believes Wallace may still be alive, but not as they remember him.

Howard conditions Wallace to think and behave like a walrus. Howard reveals that shortly before being rescued, he had killed and eaten Mr. Tusk to survive. Overcome with guilt, he has spent the last 15 years turning his victims into his beloved savior in an attempt to relive their last day and give Mr. Tusk another chance at survival. With Howard dressed in his homemade pelt, the two engage in a fight that ends when Wallace impales Howard on his tusks. Howard dies satisfied to have fulfilled his life's mission at last. LaPointe, Ally, and Teddy enter the enclave as Wallace bellows victoriously. LaPointe aims a gun at him, much to Ally’s horror.

One year later, Wallace, still living as a walrus, lives in a wildlife sanctuary. Ally and Teddy visit him and feed him a mackerel. In a flashback, Ally tells Wallace that her grandfather once told her that crying is what separates humans from animals. Ally tearfully tells Wallace she still loves him before leaving. Wallace cries as he bellows, implying that he has retained some of his humanity.

Cast
 Michael Parks as Howard Howe
 Matthew Shively as Young Howard Howe 
 Justin Long as Wallace Bryton
 Genesis Rodriguez as Ally Leon
 Haley Joel Osment as Teddy Craft
 Johnny Depp as Guy LaPointe

Additional cast members include Harley Morenstein as a border agent and Ralph Garman as a detective. Smith and Depp's daughters Harley Quinn Smith and Lily-Rose Depp portray teenage convenience store clerks, who would later be featured as the leads of Yoga Hosers. Jennifer Schwalbach Smith, Smith's wife, also makes an appearance as a waitress at Gimli Slider. Doug Banks plays the Kill Bill Kid, a parody of the Star Wars Kid viral video. Zak Knutson has an uncredited appearance as Ernest Hemingway.

Production
The idea for the film came during the recording of "SModcast 259: The Walrus and The Carpenter". In the episode, Smith with his longtime friend and producer Scott Mosier discussed an article featuring a Gumtree ad where a homeowner was offering a living situation free of charge, if the lodger agrees to dress as a walrus. The discussion went on from there, resulting in almost an hour of the episode being spent on reconstructing and telling a hypothetical story based on the ad. Smith then told his Twitter followers to tweet "#WalrusYes" if they wanted to see their hypothetical turned into a film, or "#WalrusNo" if they did not. A vast majority of Smith's following agreed that the film should be made. The post on Gumtree was in fact a prank post by noted Brighton poet and prankster Chris Parkinson, who upon hearing of the planned film said he was a big fan of Smith and that he would love to be involved. Smith eventually hired Parkinson as an associate producer in November. During the final fight between Wallace and Howard, the Fleetwood Mac song that shares its name with the title is played.

Smith wrote the 80-page screenplay while waiting for Bob Weinstein's approval of his Clerks III submission package. It was originally titled The Walrus & the Carpenter, but he changed it into a single-word title, saying he "knew what a movie about a walrus had to be called." The film is set in Bifrost, Manitoba. The movie was originally going to be produced by Blumhouse, but due to Smith's expedited timeline for filming the two amicably parted ways. Tusk was eventually financed by Demarest Films. Smith had planned on premiering the film at Sundance 2014, but this was later changed to allow more time for the score to be completed.

Smith was excited about making Tusk, saying "I wanted to right what I felt was the only wrong of Red State by scripting something with no religious or sexual politics that could grow up to be a weird little movie and not an indie film call-to-arms or a frustrated self-distribution manifesto. I just wanted to showcase Michael Parks in a fucked up story, where he could recite some Lewis Carroll and 'The Rime of the Ancient Mariner' to some poor motherfucker sewn into a realistic walrus costume." Unlike Smith's previous film Red State, Tusk had a conventional theater release, with distribution handled by A24.

Filming
The project began pre-production in September 2013. Principal photography began on November 4, 2013, and wrapped on November 22, 2013. The starting date was delayed from September to October then to November due to the filming location moving from Canada to North Carolina. An additional two days of filming occurred in Los Angeles for scenes involving Depp's character Guy LaPointe. Smith originally considered Quentin Tarantino to play LaPointe after seeing his appearance in Django Unchained but Tarantino said he had no interest in acting at the moment.

Release

Tusk had its world premiere on September 6, 2014, at the 2014 Toronto International Film Festival, where it was screened as part of Midnight Madness. It was named the first runner-up to the Midnight Madness People's Choice Award. It was screened in Los Angeles at the Vista Theatre on September 16, 2014, before its wide theatrical release on September 19.

Box office
The film was released on September 19, 2014, and was declared a box office bomb, earning only $846,831 from over 602 screens during its opening weekend, debuting in fourteenth place at the box office. At the end of its run, on November 13, the film had grossed $1,826,705 in the domestic box office and $21,612 overseas for a worldwide total of $1,848,317.

Critical reception
Tusk was met with mixed reviews from critics. On Rotten Tomatoes, the film holds a rating of 46%, based on 134 reviews, with an average rating of 5.6/10. The site's summary reads, "Tusk is pleasantly ridiculous and charmingly self-deprecating, but that isn't enough to compensate for its thin, overstretched story." The Guardian rated the movie 4 out of 5 stars, complimenting Smith as returning to his “snarky best“. On Metacritic, the film has a score of 55 out of 100, based on 33 critics, indicating "mixed or average reviews".

In his review for The Seattle Times, Erik Lundegaard gave the film zero out of four stars, stating, "Tusk, which is based on one of Smith's own podcasts, is the most disgusting and pointless movie I've seen. Emphasis on pointless. I spent half the movie sick to my stomach." William Bibbiani, writing for CraveOnline, criticized the film's failed humor and excessive runtime and said that the film "killed irony", awarding it two out of ten stars, while Glenn Dunks of Junkee.com gave the film an F and called it the worst movie of 2014.

Conversely, Chris Bumbray of JoBlo.com had a positive reaction, calling Tusk "a major return to form for Smith, and an exciting new chapter in a career that now feels totally reinvigorated." Roth Cornet from IGN gave the film eight out of ten and stated "Funny, strange, disquieting, and occasionally gory, Tusk is Kevin Smith at his best." Richard Roeper also gave Tusk a positive review, writing, "I'm recommending Kevin Smith's uniquely twisted 'Tusk', but there's a part of me that wishes I could un-see it. Over the last 15 years I've seen thousands of movies, and I can count on one hand the number of times I've actually closed my eyes during a screening because I needed a quick three-second break." Clint O'Connor of The Plain Dealer noted that while Tusk skillfully combines various genres, the story would be better presented as a short film. According to O'Connor, the character of Guy Lapointe was an homage to a famous Canadian hockey player.

Home media
Tusk was released via DVD and Blu-ray on December 30, 2014. Special features on both formats include an audio commentary by Smith, deleted scenes, the original podcast, and two featurettes.

Spin-offs and possible sequel
Smith revealed before the release of Tusk that he had written a spin-off film called Yoga Hosers, which would feature the cast from Tusk. On August 19, 2014, Borys Kit from The Hollywood Reporter revealed further details about the film. Yoga Hosers will be an action-adventure film and the second in the True North trilogy. As well as the rest of the entire cast of Tusk (except Michael Parks, who died in May 2017), the film will star Johnny Depp's daughter, Lily-Rose, and Smith's daughter, Harley Quinn. Tony Hale, Natasha Lyonne, Austin Butler, Adam Brody, Tyler Posey, and Jason Mewes have also been cast.

The third installment of Smith's True North trilogy is to be titled Moose Jaws, which Smith says is basically "Jaws with a moose". Starstream Entertainment will finance and produce the film, while XYZ Films will sell the foreign rights at the Toronto Film Festival.

Smith also mentioned an idea for a "Tusk 2", where somehow Wallace would turn himself back into a human and become the new villain. Smith made mention of title being Tusk$. In 2022, Long revealed that he had been contacted by Smith about working on a potential sequel.

References

External links

 
 
 
 

2014 films
2014 comedy horror films
American black comedy films
Body horror films
American comedy horror films
American independent films
Films directed by Kevin Smith
Works based on podcasts
American body horror films
2010s monster movies
American monster movies
Films set in country houses
Films set in Manitoba
Films shot in Los Angeles
Films shot in North Carolina
Mad scientist films
American serial killer films
A24 (company) films
SModcast Pictures films
2014 independent films
2010s English-language films
2010s American films